Hughes Fork is a stream in the U.S. state of West Virginia.

Hughes Fork was named after Jesse Hughes, a pioneer settler.

See also
List of rivers of West Virginia

References

Rivers of Lewis County, West Virginia
Rivers of West Virginia